Table tennis men's team at the 2018 Commonwealth Games was held at the Oxenford Studios on the Gold Coast, Australia from April 5 to 9.

Group stage
2 points were awarded for won tie, and 1 point for lost tie.

Group 1

Group 2

Group 3

Group 4

Group 5

Group 6

Knockout stage

Bracket

Round of 16

Quarterfinals

Semifinals

Bronze medal

Final

References

Men's team